Nick Civetta (born November 5, 1989) is an American professional rugby player currently playing for Rugby United New York (RUNY) of Major League Rugby. He also plays internationally for the United States rugby team. He plays as a second row.

He previously played for RC Vannes in the Rugby Pro D2.

University rugby
Civetta was born in White Plains, New York. Civetta's rugby career began at 18 when he began playing for the University of Notre Dame Rugby Football Club. He was named an All-American his junior and senior year. Civetta graduated with a B.S in Civil Engineering from the University of Notre Dame, and a M.S. in Geotechnical Engineering from the University of California, Berkeley. Civetta finished a M.S. at the University of Oxford in 2022. He played in the 2022 Varsity Match, earning a winning blue.

Club career
Civetta moved to Berkeley, CA and played for San Francisco Golden Gate RFC in the Rugby Super League in 2012.  In 2013, he played with New York Athletic Club in the newly formed US Elite Cup.

In the summer of 2013, Civetta signed a contract with Rome-based Lazio playing in the National Championship of Excellence competition.  After the 2013–2014 season, Civetta signed with Parma based Rugby Viadana.

On 6 May 2016, Civetta signed for England top-flight club Newcastle Falcons in the Aviva Premiership from the 2016-17 season. Civetta made his debut for Newcastle playing 58 minutes in a loss to Ospreys in the European Challenge Cup.

After spending the next season on loan with the Doncaster Knights, that he permanently joined for the 2018-19 season.

After the world cup, Civetta joined RC Vannes on a medical joker contract. He played 15 matches before the season was cut short due to the COVID-19 pandemic. 

Civetta signed with Rugby United New York for the 2021 Major League Rugby season. In April 2022 he scored a try for Oxford University in their 21–17 victory over Cambridge in the 140th Varsity Match while appearing alongside fellow American internationals, Eric Fry and Andrew Durutalo.

International career
In 2012, Civetta was selected to the USA Selects that played in the 2012 Americas Rugby Championship.  He appeared in all three games against Argentina, Canada, and Uruguay, starting two of them.

In November 2016, Civetta made his senior USA debut against New Zealand Maori and his test debut against Romania. His second cap came the following week in a 20-17 loss against Tonga.

Civetta was selected for the USA 2019 Rugby World Cup squad. He was named a starter in three pool matches against England, France, and Tonga.

References

External links 
 it's rugby data
 http://www.scarsdalenews.com/Scarsdale_Inquirer/Scarsdale_Inquirer_SPOTLIGHT_042514.html

1989 births
Living people
American rugby union players
Notre Dame College of Engineering alumni
UC Berkeley College of Engineering alumni
People from White Plains, New York
Sportspeople from New York (state)
United States international rugby union players
Rugby union locks
Rugby union flankers
S.S. Lazio Rugby 1927 players
Rugby Viadana players
Newcastle Falcons players
Doncaster Knights players
Rugby Club Vannes players
Rugby New York players
Rugby Club I Medicei players
American expatriate sportspeople in Italy
American expatriate rugby union players
American expatriate sportspeople in France
American expatriate sportspeople in England
Oxford University RFC players